Home Alone 2: Lost in New York is a 1992 video game based loosely on the 1992 film of the same name; it was released on the Nintendo Entertainment System, Genesis, Game Boy, DOS and Super NES platforms. It was dedicated to Tom D. Heidt, a programmer who died shortly before it was released.

Development
The game was unveiled in October 1992.

The game was released in late 1992 for all three Nintendo consoles available at the time. Mechanically, the three versions are identical, with the Game Boy version being virtually identical to the NES version aside from the monochrome graphics, lowered resolution, minor gameplay and map differences. The DOS version was released in 1992. The Genesis version was released a year later in 1993.

In June 2016, video game developer Frank Cifaldi found the NES version's source code on an old hard drive and released it to the public. He has stated the game's code was based on The Simpsons-licensed titles on the NES, also by Imagineering.

A sequel for the Game Boy version, entitled Home Alone 2: Lost In New York: Kevin's Dream, was slated for release in 1994, as made by Unexpected Development, but it was cancelled before it came out. Unexpected Development would re-work the title to be based on the Fox Kids animated series Bobby's World, complete with Super Game Boy functionality, but a planned 1995 release by Hi Tech Entertainment also did not occur. The ROM for both versions of the game was leaked online in September 2020.

Gameplay
The player controls Kevin McCallister as he makes his way alone through New York City. Locations include the Plaza Hotel, Central Park, Kevin's uncle's townhouse and the streets of New York. Kevin fights enemies using a Slide, Flying Fist and Super Flying Fist moves; for weapons, he uses a Dart gun. Using a Necklace will cause walking enemies to slip off the screen (referencing a scene where Kevin uses the pearls from a necklace to trip up his pursuers). Powerups include Pizza Slices, Whole Pie, Cookies, Bells, Candy Canes and After Shave.

Reception

Home Alone 2: Lost in New York was awarded Worst Sequel of 1992 by Electronic Gaming Monthly. They also awarded it Worst Movie-to-Game of 1996.

See also
Home Alone, a video game based on the earlier movie

References

1992 video games
Nintendo Entertainment System games
Super Nintendo Entertainment System games
Game Boy games
Sega Genesis games
DOS games
Home Alone (franchise) video games
Video game sequels
Video games scored by Mark Van Hecke
Video games set in New York City
THQ games
Imagineering (company) games
Commercial video games with freely available source code
Video games developed in the United States
Single-player video games